Two human polls comprised the 1989 National Collegiate Athletic Association (NCAA) Division I-A football rankings. Unlike most sports, college football's governing body, the NCAA, does not bestow a national championship, instead that title is bestowed by one or more different polling agencies. There are two main weekly polls that begin in the preseason—the AP Poll and the Coaches Poll.

Legend

AP Poll
The AP poll expanded to 25 teams in 1989.

Coaches Poll

References

NCAA Division I FBS football rankings